The University of Waikato, is a public research university in Hamilton, New Zealand established in 1964. An  additional campus is located in Tauranga.
The university performs research in the disciplines of education, social sciences, and management and is an innovator in environmental science, marine and freshwater ecology, engineering and computer science.
It offers degrees in health, engineering, computer science, management, Māori and Indigenous Studies, the arts, psychology, social sciences and education.

History

In the mid-1950s, regional and national leaders recognised the need for a new university and urged the then University of New Zealand (UNZ) and the government to establish one in Hamilton. Their campaign coincided with a shortage of school teachers, and after years of lobbying, Minister of Education Philip Skoglund agreed to open a teachers’ college in the region.
In 1960, the newly established Hamilton Teachers’ College, joined by a fledgling university (initially a branch of the University of Auckland), opened a joint campus at Ruakura

In 1964, the two institutions moved to their new home, and the following year the University of Waikato was officially opened by then Governor-General Sir Bernard Fergusson.

At that time, the university comprised a School of Humanities and a School of Social Sciences. In 1969 a School of Science was established. This was followed by the creation of the Waikato Management School in 1972, Computer Science and Computing Services in 1973, and the School of Law in 1990.

In 1990 the Hamilton Teacher's college merged with the University of Waikato 

From the beginning, it was envisaged that Māori studies should be a key feature of the new university, and the Centre for Māori Studies and Research was established in the School of Social Sciences in 1972. A separate School of Māori and Pacific Development was formally established in 1996 and in 2016, became Te Pua Wānanga ki te Ao, Faculty of Māori and Indigenous Studies. In 1999, the original Schools of Humanities and Social Sciences were merged to form the School of Arts and Social Sciences.

In 2018 the university was reorganised under a divisional structure which resulted in its Schools and Faculties being brought under four Divisions and a School; Division of Arts, Law, Psychology and Social Sciences, Division of Education, Division of Health, Engineering and Computer Sciences, Waikato Management School and the Faculty of Māori and Indigenous Studies. Although the university has had a presence in Tauranga since the 1990s, it officially opened its dedicated Tauranga campus in 2019 located in Tauranga's CBD. This added to the university's presence in the Bay of Plenty with the Adams Centre for High Performance in Mount Maunganui and the Coastal Marine Field Station in Sulphur Point on the Tauranga Harbour. In November 2020, the university also opened a new algal research and aquaculture facility in Sulphur Point.

The Kīngitanga, Waikato-Tainui and the university

Born in the 1840s and 1850s, the establishment of the Kīngitanga was a united national response of Māori chiefs to the effects of the signing of Te Tiriti o Waitangi/The Treaty of Waitangi, and the establishment of the settler Government. From its inception, the Kīngitanga has had the role of leading, governing and representing Māori, as the rafters on one side of the house of Aotearoa, with the Queen and her subjects as the rafters on the other.

In relation to the university, the Kīngitanga has played a pivotal role, with King Koroki giving his personal support to the establishment of a university in Kirikiriroa/Hamilton, which led to the project gaining the support of Waikato iwi. This is notable as, when the University of Waikato was set up in 1964, it was on a site that had been part of lands confiscated from Waikato-Tainui by the Crown in 1865, only returned later, in 1995.

The university and the Kīngitanga have had an active relationship over the course of the university's history, including the establishment of the new campus in Tauranga, and the awarding of honorary doctorates to a number of tribal members. Most recently, doctoral honours were awarded to Kīngi Tūheitia in 2016.

Administration and organisation

Governance
 

The chief executive of the University of Waikato is the vice-chancellor, currently Professor Neil Quigley. The university is governed by a council, headed by the university's chancellor, who is currently former New Zealand governor-general Sir Anand Satyanand.

Te Rōpū Manukura was formed in 1991 as a consultative body to the university council. Te Rōpū Manukura is currently made up of members from over 20 different iwi within the catchment area of the university.

The following list shows the university's chancellors:

Campuses
The University of Waikato operates from two campuses, Hamilton, and Tauranga. Undergraduate degrees are also offered through a joint-institute on a satellite campus at Zhejiang University City College in Hangzhou.

Hamilton 
The main Hamilton campus is spread over 64 hectares of landscaped gardens and lakes, and includes extensive sporting and recreational areas. Originally farmland, the campus was designed by architect John Blake-Kelly in 1964. The open space landscaping contains extensive native plantings, including a fernery, centred around three lakes.

Tauranga 
The University of Waikato previously shared campuses with Toi Ohomai Institute of Technology in Tauranga at Windmere in the central city. In March 2019, the university opened a stand-alone campus in the central city.

The Student Centre officially opened in 2011 by Waikato alumnus Governor-General Jerry Mateparae.

Rankings

In the latest 2021 QS rankings, The University of Waikato is ranked at 373 out of the world's top 1,000 universities. Additionally, the university has been ranked between 501 and 600 for the Times Higher (THE) World University Rankings and between 101 and 200 in the THE Impact Rankings.

Notable people

Notable alumni

Waikato Management School
 Rt Hon Jacinda Ardern, 40th Prime Minister of New Zealand
 Jan Zijderveld, former CEO of Avon Products and Europe President at Unilever
 Vittoria Shortt, CEO ASB Bank
 Kevin Bowler, CEO My Food Bag

Division of Arts, Law and Social Sciences
 Judge Craig Coxhead, Māori Land Court Judge and Chief Justice of Niue
 Tania Te Rangingangana Simpson, Deputy Chair and Director Reserve Bank of New Zealand
 The Honourable Dame Annette King, Former Member of Parliament
 Wayne Smith, CNZM previous All Blacks player and 2011 All Blacks coach

Division of Health, Engineering, Computing and Mathematical Sciences and Science
 Dr Shane Legg, Co-founder and Chief Scientist Google DeepMind
 Dr Craig Nevill-Manning, Founder and Director of Google’s first remote engineering centre, key developer of Google Maps and Froogle
 Dr Andrew Smith, CEO Profile Foods
 Professor Tom Higham, Professor of Archaeological Science, Deputy Director of the Oxford Radiocarbon Accelerator Unit
 Dr Ian Graham, former Dean, founder of Endace, and New Zealand's Engineering Entrepreneur of 2011.

Division of Education
 Professor Fui Le’api Tu’ua ‘Īlaoa Asofou So’o, Vice-Chancellor and President of the National University of Samoa
 Warren Gatland OBE, Head Coach, Chiefs, British and Irish Lions
 Alyn Ware, International Representative of the Peace Foundation, International Coordinator for the Parliamentary Network for Nuclear Disarmament and Consultant for the International Association of Lawyers Against Nuclear Arms
 Honourable Dr Derek Sikua, ninth Prime Minister of the Solomon Islands

Faculty of Maori and Indigenous Studies
 Hinewehi Mohi MNZM, Managing Director, Raukatauri Productions Ltd, singer and songwriter, co-founder and trustee of the Raukatauri Music Therapy Centre
 Tania Te Rangingangana Simpson, Deputy Chair and Director Reserve Bank of New Zealand
 Turanga Hoturoa Barclay-Kerr CNZM, master voyager and co-chair of the national coordinating committee for the Tuia 250 - Encounters programme
 Willow-Jean Prime, Member of Parliament

The University of Waikato's official website lists other notable alumni, referred as "Distinguished Alumni" by the university.

Notable faculty and honorary doctorates
 University of Waikato faculty
 List of honorary doctors of the University of Waikato

References

External links

 
Waikato
Public universities
Educational institutions established in 1964
1964 establishments in New Zealand